Kanchanaburi may refer to
the town Kanchanaburi
Kanchanaburi Province
Mueang Kanchanaburi district